Riverside Polytechnic High School is a four-year public high school in Riverside, California, United States, and part of the Riverside Unified School District.  The current facility, located on Victoria Avenue, was opened in September 1965; the traditions of the school go back to 1887, then known as the Riverside High School, making Riverside Polytechnic the oldest high school in the city.

History 

Riverside Polytechnic High School traces its heritage from 1887,
when the newly formed city of Riverside needed higher education for the community.  The first joint elementary and high school's first graduating class in 1890 comprised seven students—four girls and three boys. Eugenie Fuller was its principal. When classes grew too large in 1902, a new co-educational high school building was constructed on Ninth Street between Lemon and Lime Streets, and the original 14th Street building became the Grant School, serving grades 3–8.

In 1910, Riverside High School's enrollment was approximately 500 students, and new facilities were required. In 1911, the genders were separated, creating a Girls High School at the Ninth Street building, and the Polytechnic High School for boys at a newly constructed campus on Terracina Avenue. Fuller continued as principal of the Girls High School, and Mr. J.E. McKown was appointed principal of the Riverside Polytechnic High School.

In 1916, the Polytechnic High School began offering postgraduate classes. The Riverside Junior College District was formed in 1920, and the Riverside Junior College moved out of the high school to an adjacent property.

World War I brought changes to both high school campuses. The earlier enrollment explosion waned as young men joined the armed forces. In 1924, the school board created a junior high school level and consolidated the senior high schools into one co-educational school. A new Applied Arts Building provided Home Economics and "other facilities for the girls." The old Girls High School now served as a Girls Junior High School, while the Boys Junior High School was located at the old Grant School. 1924–25 saw the Junior College and the Senior High School with growing enrollments, and so provided separate administrations for each. There were 202 seniors in 1924.

During World War II, many Poly girls worked with a federal government–sponsored group called the High School Victory Corps.
The girls helped make bandages and other needed items, or worked in essential industries after school. All who took part in these activities were volunteers. In 1944, the Victory Corps was discontinued at Poly.

In the 1940s, there was a tradition that each incoming class at the school would be given an unflattering nickname that would remain with the class until their graduation.  For example, the class of 1951 was dubbed the "Geeks" and the class of 1953 was the "Orts".

In 1956, double sessions at Poly were needed until a second high school, Ramona High, could be built. As high school enrollment continued to grow, it was evident that a third high school would be needed in Riverside. In 1960, a new high school, Rubidoux, shared the Poly campus until its campus could be completed in 1961.  In 1965, Poly separated from the junior college campus and a site on the corner of Central and Victoria Avenues was built, along with a high school on Third Street and Chicago Avenue, named North High. Both high schools opened their doors in September 1965, with the Victoria site keeping the traditional name of Riverside Polytechnic High School. Since that time, Poly High School classes have taken place on the present site.

Riverside Polytechnic High School is home to one of the original, still active Army Junior Reserve Officers' Training Corps (JROTC) units, established in 1917 and was originally called the Poly High Cadet Corps. It is the oldest JROTC program west of the Mississippi River, and second oldest in the United States. In 1970 it was among the first JROTC units to offer a girls program 

There were 51 young men making up the Class of 1916, known as the "Stags of 1916". There were 18 faculty members. This class was the first to complete the four-year course offered in the new building.

Notable alumni

Notable instructors
 Edmund Jaeger – noted naturalist, his first zoology class in 1921 had 3 students

References

External links
 Official School website
 

Polytechnic
Public high schools in California
Educational institutions established in 1887
1887 establishments in California